The Hughes TH-55 Osage is a piston-powered light training helicopter produced for the United States Army. It was also produced as the Model 269 family of light utility helicopters, some of which were marketed as the Model 300. The Model 300C was produced and further developed by Schweizer after 1983.

Development 

In 1955, Hughes Tool Company's Aircraft Division carried out a market survey which showed that there was a demand for a low-cost, lightweight two-seat helicopter. The division began building the Model 269 in September 1955. It was initially designed with a fully glazed cockpit with seating for two pilots, or a pilot and passenger. It also had an open-framework fuselage and a three-blade articulated rotor. The prototype flew on 2 October 1956, but it wasn't until 1960 that the decision was made to develop the helicopter for production. The original truss-work tailboom was replaced with a tubular tailboom and the cockpit was restructured and refined prior to being put into production, resulting in the Model 269A. With this model, Hughes successfully captured a large portion of the civilian helicopter market with an aircraft that would prove itself popular in agriculture, police work and other duties.

Design 

The Hughes 269 was designed with a fully articulated, three-blade main rotor designed by Drago Jovanovich, and a two-blade tail rotor that would remain as distinctive characteristics of all its variants. It also has shock absorber-damped, skid-type landing gear. The flight controls are directly linked to the swashplate of the helicopter so there are no hydraulic systems in the 269. There are generally two sets of controls, although this was optional on the civil 269A. For three-seat aircraft, the middle collective control stick is removable and a seat cushion can be put in its place for the third passenger.

Operational history 

In 1958, prior to full-time production, Hughes provided five preproduction Model 269A examples to the U.S. Army for evaluation as a light observation helicopter to replace the aging OH-13 Sioux and OH-23 Raven. Designated as the YHO-2HU the helicopter was eventually turned down. On 9 April 1959, the 269A received certification from the FAA. Hughes continued to concentrate on civil production, and deliveries of the Model 269A began in 1961. By mid-1963 about 20 aircraft were being produced a month and by the spring of 1964, 314 had been built.

While the U.S. Army had not found the Model 269A adequate for combat missions, in 1964 it adopted a modified version of the 269A as its training helicopter to replace the TH-23 and designated it the TH-55A Osage. 792 TH-55 helicopters would be delivered by 1969, and it would remain in service as the U.S. Army's primary helicopter trainer until it was replaced in 1988 by the UH-1 Huey. At the time of its replacement, over 60,000 U.S. Army pilots had trained on TH-55 making it the U.S. Army's longest serving training helicopter. In addition to the U.S. Army, Hughes delivered TH-55/269/300s to other military customers.

In 1964, Hughes introduced the slightly larger three-seat Model 269B which it marketed as the Hughes 300. That same year, the Hughes 269 set an endurance record of 101 hours. To set the record, two pilots took turns piloting the aircraft and hovered in ground-effect for fueling. To ensure no cheating, eggs were attached to the bottom of the skid gear to register any record-ending landing.

The Hughes 300 was followed in 1969 by the improved Hughes 300C (sometimes 269C), which first flew on 6 March 1969 and received FAA certification in May 1970. This new model introduced a more powerful 190 hp (140 kW) Lycoming HIO-360-D1A engine and an increased-diameter rotor, giving a payload increase of 45%, plus overall performance improvements. It was this model that Schweizer began building under license from Hughes in 1983. In 1986, Schweizer acquired all rights to the helicopter from McDonnell Douglas, who had purchased Hughes Helicopters in 1984, and renamed it McDonnell Douglas Helicopter Systems. For a few years after, Schweizer acquired the FAA Type Certificate  known as the Schweizer-Hughes 300. While Schweizer made over 250 minor improvements, the basic design remained unchanged.

Between Hughes and Schweizer, and including foreign-licensed production civil and military training aircraft, nearly 3,000 copies of the Model 269/300 have been built and flown over the last 50 years. That would have been the end of the story, but Schweizer continued to develop the model 300 by adding a turbine and redesigning the body to create the model 330m, and then further developed the dynamic components to take greater advantage of the power of the turbine engine; this led to the development of the Model 333.

Variants 

Hughes 269  Two prototype aircraft powered by a 180 hp Lycoming O-360-A engine and had a truss tailboom. First flown on 2 October 1956.
Customers also had the option for dual controls, and a 19 gal (72 liter) auxiliary tank.
YHO-2 Five 269A aircraft were evaluated by the U.S. Army for an observation helicopter in 1957-58, originally designated XH-42. The Army did not order the YHO-2 due to lack of funds.
269A-1 "Model 200" The 269A-1, which Hughes marketed as the Model 200, was an improved version of the 269A certified by the FAA on 23 August 1963. Hughes sold two versions of the Model 200: the ordinary Model 200 Utility and the Model 200 Deluxe with added custom interior decor and electrically operated trim for the cyclic control.
TH-55A Military version of the 269A-1 (Model 200) built for the U.S. Army as its standard primary training helicopter and named after the Osage Native American tribe; student pilots nicknamed it the "Mattel Messerschmitt". Although basically the same as the Model 200, the TH-55A was fitted with military radio and instrumentation. 792 TH-55As were purchased by the Army between 1964 and 1967. An experimental TH-55A was fitted with an Allison 250-C18 turboshaft engine, and another would be fitted with a  Wankel RC 2-60 rotary engine.
TH-55J 38 license-produced versions of the TH-55A, built by Kawasaki for the Japanese Ground Self-Defense Force.
269B "Model 300" Featuring a three-seat cockpit, the 269B was powered by a 190 hp (141 kW) Lycoming HIO-360-A1A engine and was marketed as the Hughes Model 300. Optional floats were also available on the 300, the first time available on any 269-variant.
280U single-seat, utility version of the 269B with an electric clutch and trim system. The 280U could be fitted with spraying equipment for agricultural applications.
300AG 269B designed specifically for agricultural spraying with a 30 gal (114 liter) chemical tank on each side of the fuselage, and a 35 feet (10.67 m) spray boom.
300B 269B with a Quiet Tail Rotor installed to reduce exterior noise levels to that of a light airplane. The QTR was installed on all production models starting in June 1967 and offered as a kit for previously built aircraft.

The larger rotor and engine giving it a 45% performance increase over previous 269-models. Hughes and Schweizer both marketed the 269C as the Model 300C.
NH-300C License-built 269C by Italian aircraft manufacturing firm BredaNardi.
300C Sky Knight Police patrol version of the Model 300C.
TH-300C Military training version.

Operators 

 Algerian Air Force

 Brazilian Navy

 Colombian Air Force

 Ministry of Public Security

 Greece
 Hellenic Army - operates 20 Breda Nardi NH300C in training role.

Haiti Air Force
 
Honduran Air Force

 Indian Navy

 Japanese Ground Self-Defense Force

 Peruvian Air Force

 Sierra Leone Air Arm 

 Spanish Air Force

 Swedish Army

Republic of China Army

 Royal Thai Army  

 Turkish Army

 United States Army

Specifications (Hughes 300)

See also

Notes

References

Bibliography
 Abulo, Samuel A.  "The Story of the PC/INP Air Unit." The Constable & INP Journal, 17 July–August 1985, pp. 27–31.
 Apostolo, Giorgio. The Illustrated Encyclopedia of Helicopters. New York: Bonanza Books, 1984. .
 

 Frawley, Gerard. The International Directory of Civil Aircraft, 2003-2004. Fyshwick ACT, Australia: Aerospace Publications Pty Ltd, 2003. .
 Frawley, Gerard. The International Directory of Military Aircraft. Fyshwick ACT, Australia: Aerospace Publications Pty Ltd, 2002. .
 Gunston, Bill. The Illustrated Encyclopedia of the World's Modern Military Aircraft. New York: Crescent Books, 1978. .
 Hirschberg, Michael J. and David K. Daley. US and Russian Helicopter Development In the 20th Century. 2000.

External links

 US and Russian Helicopter Development In the 20th Century

1950s United States helicopters
United States military helicopters
1960s United States military utility aircraft
1960s United States civil utility aircraft
Hughes aircraft
Single-engined piston helicopters
Aircraft first flown in 1956